Abdul Hannan Moosa Didi (13 June 1959) is a Maldivian singer, music composer and producer.

Early life and career
At the age of seventeen, Didi started performing casually with his friends which helped him develop self-confidence and improve his singing capabilities. In 1977, he was offered a stage performance in a tourist resort to celebrate one of their occasions, which resulted in him getting several offers. During the time, he was more keen to perform English language songs than Hindustani classical songs. Apart from singing, he has also contributed to the industry by composing original music and tracks for films, albums and events. One of his most acclaimed music composition includes "Kaiveneege Amaazu" from the film Haali.

In 1983, the Government of Maldives honoured her with the National Award of Recognition, which makes him the fourth male singer to receive this honour. In the Aafathis Awards ceremony held in 1998, he received the Best Male Playback Singer Award for his performance in the song "Leygaa Vaathee Nan" from the film Fathis Handhuvaru (1997), which was widely appreciated for his possession of high vocal range in the song. At the 4th Gaumee Film Awards ceremony, Hannan was bestowed as the Best Male Playback Singer for his classical rendition of the song "Ossifavaa Iru Eree Ey" from the film Edhi Edhi Hoadheemey (2003). He received his second nomination in the same category for the title song of Kuhveriakee Kaakuhey? (2011) at the 7th Gaumee Film Awards.

After relocating to Sri Lanka, Hannan slowly distanced himself from the industry, though during the time he served as the producer of the film Kuhveriakee Kaakuhey? which directed by his wife, Aishath Ali Manik. A film he considered as a "family production" was theatrically released in 2011, though the film was written in 2007 by their two daughters Hawwa Alishan and Ulvy. Inspired by Ram Gopal Varma's Bollywood horror romantic thriller film Darling (2007), the film revolves around a man who cheats on his wife with his secretary, and how his life slides to a haunting shift when he accidentally kills his mistress. Upon release, the film received negative response from critics and was declared a flop at box office. Apart from producing the film, he contributed to the soundtrack album of films including Kuhveriakee Kaakuhey? which also resulted in him being nominated in the Best Original Song composition for the title track of the film.

Discography

Feature films

Television

Non-film songs

Accolades

References 

Living people
People from Malé
1959 births
Maldivian playback singers